Guillermo Durán and Horacio Zeballos were the defending champions but chose to participate with different partners. Durán played alongside Andrés Molteni while Zeballos played with Julio Peralta. Durán lost in the first round to Andrea Arnaboldi and Ramkumar Ramanathan.

Zealous successfully defended his title, defeating Aliaksandr Bury and Andrei Vasilevski 6–4, 6–3 in the final.

Seeds

Draw

References
 Main Draw

AON Open Challenger - Doubles
AON Open Challenger
AON